Ptychidio is a genus of cyprinid fish endemic to China.

Species
There are currently three recognized species in this genus:
 Ptychidio jordani G. S. Myers, 1930
 Ptychidio longibarbus Yi-Yu Chen & Y. F. Chen, 1989
 Ptychidio macrops S. M. Fang, 1981

References

Cyprinidae genera
Cyprinid fish of Asia
Freshwater fish of China
Labeoninae